During the Parade of Nations at the 2010 Winter Olympics opening ceremony, held beginning at 6:00 PM PST on February 12, 2010, 82 athletes bearing the flags of their respective nations led their national delegations as they paraded into BC Place Stadium in the host city of Vancouver, British Columbia, Canada.

Athletes entered the stadium in an order dictated by tradition. As the originator of the Olympics, Greece entered first. Canadian delegates entered last, representing the host nation. The names of the nations were announced first in French and followed by English, the official languages of the Olympics, which also happened to be the official languages of the host nation. The nations entered in alphabetic order of their country names in English because it is the more dominant of the two languages in Vancouver and in the province of British Columbia.

Delegations from North Korea and South Korea marched in separate delegations, unlike in the 2006 Winter Olympics when they marched together.

Of the flag-bearers who led their respective delegations, all but one were athletes, the exception being Fuad Guliyev, a skating official from Azerbaijan. The sport which was most represented among the flag-bearers was alpine skiing, as alpine skiers led 26 delegations. Only one delegation was led by a short track speed skater, Hong Kong, led by Han Yue Shueng. Marjan Kalhor, an alpine skier and the flag-bearer for Iran, was both the first female flag bearer from her country and the first female athlete from her country to participate in the Winter Olympics. It was erroneously pointed out by a Canadian TV commentator that Tomomi Okazaki was the first female flag bearer for Japan. This title goes to Seiko Hashimoto in Calgary 1988. Other prominent flag bearers included Canadian speed skater and five-time Olympian Clara Hughes, American luger Mark Grimmette, who had helped carry the American flag during the 2002 Winter Olympics, and Czech hockey player Jaromír Jágr. Hughes is the only Olympian ever to win multiple medals at both the Summer and Winter Olympics.

Iason Abramashvili, flag bearer for Georgia, along with the other members of his delegation, wore black armbands during the march and received a standing ovation in memory of Nodar Kumaritashvili, a Georgian luger who was killed in an accident during a training run earlier in the day.

Parade of Nations

Kudratov carried the flag even though he wasn't scheduled to compete.

See also
2010 Winter Olympics closing ceremony flag bearers
2010 Winter Paralympics national flag bearers
2008 Summer Olympics national flag bearers

References

Specific

General
 

National Flag Bearers, 2010 Winter Olympics
Lists of Olympic flag bearers

it:Cerimonia di apertura dei XXI Giochi olimpici invernali#Gli alfieri